Nikolas Terkelsen Nartey (born 22 February 2000) is a Danish professional footballer who plays as a midfielder for Bundesliga club VfB Stuttgart.

Club career

Youth career
Nartey began his career at the age of 8 at AB. He then joined F.C. Copenhagen at the age of 12. At 16 years old, he had already played for the U19 squad of F.C. Copenhagen. He played five UEFA Youth League games.

1. FC Köln
At the age of 16, Nartey joined 1. FC Köln in Germany on 31 January 2017 for about 4 million danish krone. Meanwhile, he was not able to play until 19 April because of some problems with his papers. He only managed to play four games in that first half season for the reserve team.

He got his professional debut for 1. FC Köln on 26 November 2017 when he came in from the bench with 7 minutes left against Hertha BSC. However, it was not a successful year for Nartey, due to several knee-injuries in the 2017–18 season.

VfB Stuttgart
On 29 August 2019, Nartey joined VfB Stuttgart on a four-year deal. A day later after joining Stuttgart, Nartey was loaned out to Hansa Rostock for the 2019–20 season.

On 31 July 2020, Nartey was loaned out to SV Sandhausen until the end of the season.

Personal life
Nartey is of Ghanaian descent through his father and his mother is Danish.

References

External links

 
 
 

2000 births
Living people
People from Gladsaxe Municipality
Danish people of Ghanaian descent
Sportspeople from the Capital Region of Denmark
Danish men's footballers
Association football midfielders
Denmark under-21 international footballers
Denmark youth international footballers
Bundesliga players
2. Bundesliga players
Regionalliga players
1. FC Köln II players
1. FC Köln players
VfB Stuttgart players
VfB Stuttgart II players
FC Hansa Rostock players
SV Sandhausen players
Danish expatriate men's footballers
Danish expatriate sportspeople in Germany
Expatriate footballers in Germany